Yvonne L. Andrews (born April 23, 1951), known professionally as Tina Andrews,  is an American actress, television producer, screenwriter, author and playwright. She played Valerie Grant in the NBC soap opera series Days of Our Lives from 1975 until 1977.

Andrews also wrote the TV mini-series, Sally Hemings: An American Scandal, which was the first time that the relationship between Thomas Jefferson and Sally Hemings had been explored on TV, and with Hemings portrayed as a fully realized woman. In 2001, Andrews was the first African American to win the Writers Guild of America award for Original Long Form, for her script for this mini-series.

Biography

Early life and education
Andrews was born Yvonne L. Andrews, the older of two children to Eloise Andrews in Chicago, Illinois. Andrews attended Harlan Community Academy High School, where she participated in Modern Dance, Student Council and Drama Club. After graduating high school in 1969, Andrews studied at New York University; majoring in Drama.

Career

Acting
Andrews spent many years acting in such series as Days of Our Lives, where she originated the role of Valerie Grant from 1975 to 1977. Her character was part of the first interracial romance shown on daytime television. Thereafter, Andrews played Angie Wheeler in The Sanford Arms. She also acted in the influential TV mini-series, Roots (1977), as Aurelia, the girlfriend of the character Kunta Kinte. From this role, she met and became professional partners with Alex Haley, the author of the book on which it was based and the screenplay for the series. Haley hired Andrews to work with him on the miniseries Alex Haley's Great Men of African Descent, which aired on PBS. Haley also mentored Andrews' literary work. Andrews portrayed Valerie on Falcon Crest in 1983 and Josie in the television movie Born Innocent with Linda Blair. Andrews' had guest appearances as characters on many shows, including The Odd Couple, Love Story, Sanford and Son, Good Times and The Brady Bunch. She also performed in films such as Conrack  and Carny.

Writing
Tina Andrews had been long interested in the story of Sally Hemings and Thomas Jefferson. She wrote a play, The Mistress of Monticello, which was produced in Chicago in 1985 to good notices. About ten years later, her play was brought to the notice of producer Craig Anderson, and he started working with Andrews on developing it as a script for TV. Her play was produced in staged readings at the Southampton Cultural Center in February 2013.

Andrews ended up working on the Hemings project for nearly 16 years. She did research, both on Hemings, about whom little is known, and Jefferson. Craig Anderson had optioned the rights to historian Fawn McKay Brodie's 1974 biography of Jefferson, which had explored the possibility of the long-rumored relationship with Hemings. She concluded that they did have a liaison and children. While Andrews was working on her script, a DNA study in 1998 demonstrated a match between the male lines of descendants of Hemings and Jefferson, which shifted the consensus of major historians of Jefferson, such as Joseph Ellis. He announced that he believed that Jefferson had a long-term relationship with Hemings and fathered all her children. Andrews completed her script, and the team took it to production. In 2000, CBS aired Sally Hemings: An American Scandal. It was directed by Charles Haid and starred Carmen Ejogo as Hemings and Sam Neill as Jefferson.

As PBS noted of the mini-series in a Frontline program, Jefferson's Blood (2000), about the Jefferson-Hemings controversy, "Though many quarreled with the portrayal of Hemings as unrealistically modern and heroic, no major historian challenged the series' premise that Hemings and Jefferson had a 38-year relationship that produced children." Andrews has also written screenplays, including the movie, Why Do Fools Fall in Love (1998). In 2019, Andrews joined other WGA writers in firing their agents as part of the WGA's stand against the ATA and the practice of packaging.

Literary works
Following the production of the mini-series in 2000, Andrews published the non-fiction book Sally Hemings: An American Scandal: The Struggle to Tell the Controversial Truth (2001). It recounts her work over 16 years to bring Hemings' story to a larger audience. The book was published by Malibu Press. She wrote an essay for The First Time I Got Paid For It: Writers Tales From the Hollywood Trenches (2002). Andrews novel, The Hollywood Dolls (2009), was published by Malibu Press. Her Charlotte Sophia: Myth, Madness, and the Moor (2010) is a historical novel about Charlotte of Mecklenburg, the wife of King George III of Great Britain. A paperback edition was published in 2013. She explores the life of the queen, building on a 21st theory that she had a black ancestor in the 13th century. Historians do not agree on this theory, and also argue that an ancestor so far removed means little, as Charlotte was raised in the Germanic culture. Andrews has adapted the Charlotte novel as a play called Buckingham, which premiered at the Southampton Cultural Center in May 2013.

Awards and nominations
In 1999, Andrews received a nomination at the Acapulco Black Film Festival for Best Screenplay, for the 1998 movie Why Do Fools Fall in Love. In 2001, Andrews was the first African American to win the Writers Guild of America award for Original Long Form, for her script for the 2000 miniseries Sally Hemings: An American Scandal. She shared the award with Phil Alden Robinson and Stanley Weiser, who won for the 2000 movie Freedom Song. That year Andrews also won the NAACP Image Award for Outstanding TV Movie, Miniseries or Special. In 2002, Andrews won two awards for her book about developing the Hemings story as a TV mini-series: the NAACP Image Award for Outstanding Achievement in Literary Nonfiction and the Literary Award of Excellence from the Memphis Black Writers Conference. In 2003, Andrews won the MIB/Prism Filmmaker Image Award, and she received a proclamation from the City Council of New York that year.

Personal
Andrews has been married once and has no children. Andrews is currently married to theatre and documentary filmmaker Stephen Gaines.

References

Further reading
 Sally Hemings An American Scandal: The Struggle to Tell the Controversial Truth (autobiography), Malibu Press, 2001. /
 Her essay in First Time I Got Paid for It: Writers Tales from the Hollywood Trenches, pp. 4–8 (autobiography), Di Capo Press, 2002. /

External links
 

1951 births
20th-century African-American women
20th-century African-American people
20th-century American actresses
21st-century African-American women
Actresses from Chicago
American soap opera actresses
American television actresses
American television writers
American women dramatists and playwrights
American women television writers
Living people
Screenwriters from Illinois
Tisch School of the Arts alumni
Writers from Chicago
Writers Guild of America Award winners